Look: The Series is an American television drama series that was broadcast on Showtime from October 10 to December 19, 2010. It is written, produced, and directed by Adam Rifkin. Based on the 2007 film of the same title, Look is shot entirely from the point of view of security cameras.

Look follows several interweaving storylines over the course of a week in Los Angeles, some including characters carried over from the original film, others featuring actors from the film returning as different characters. According to the series, there are now approximately 30 million surveillance cameras in the United States generating more than 4 billion hours of footage every week. Both the film and the series raise questions about privacy and security for the audience in a world with a high proliferation of cameras.

Cast and characters

Main cast
 Colton Haynes as Shane (a high school student)
 Sharon Hinnendael as Hannah (a devious and manipulative high school student who has a crush on Shane)
 Ali Cobrin as Molly (a high school student and Hannah's friend who competes with her for Shane's affection)
 Claudia Christian as Stella (Lenny's drug addicted wife and mother)
 Marcus Giamatti as Lenny (a lawyer and Stella's husband and father) 
 Giuseppe Andrews as Willie (a convenience store clerk and aspiring musician; from the feature film)
 Miles Dougal as Carl (Willie's friend; also from the feature film)
 Robert Curtis Brown as Dan the Weatherman (a TV news anchor and Hannah's father)
 Trevor Torseth as Ron (a homeless army veteran)
 Richard Speight, Jr. as a Taxi Driver and serial rapist/killer
 Jhoanna Trias as Armani (an erotic dancer at a local nightclub)
 Matt Bushell as Officer Lewis (a police officer and Willie's father)
 Lee Reherman as Officer Munson (a police officer and Officer Lewis' partner)
 Jordan Belfi as Andy (Dan's cynical co-worker)
 Haley Hudson as Amanda (Willie's girlfriend)
 Ravi Patel as Vinnay
 Brendan Kelly as Tom (an auto mechanic and Stella's adulterous lover)

Guest appearances
 Gianna Michaels as an erotic dancer
 Sophie Dee as an erotic dancer
 Alexis Knapp as DeDe (an erotic dancer)
 Ron Jeremy (credited as Ron Hyatt) as 'Ugly Fatso'

Episodes
 Episode One – October 10, 2010
 Episode Two – October 17, 2010
 Episode Three – October 24, 2010
 Episode Four – October 31, 2010
 Episode Five – November 7, 2010
 Episode Six – November 14, 2010
 Episode Seven – November 21, 2010
 Episode Eight – November 28, 2010
 Episode Nine – December 5, 2010
 Episode Ten – December 12, 2010
 Episode Eleven – December 19, 2010

Home media
The entire series is currently available on DVD.

References

External links 

2010 American television series debuts
2010 American television series endings
2010s American drama television series
English-language television shows
Showtime (TV network) original programming
Television shows set in Los Angeles
Television series by CBS Studios